Pavel Sergeyevich Karasyov (born 10 July 1992) is a Russian football player. He plays as a central midfielder for Rotor Volgograd.

Club career
He made his debut in the Russian Second Division for FC Lokomotiv-2 Moscow on 21 April 2011 in a game against FC Dynamo Kostroma.

He made his Russian Premier League debut for FC Anzhi Makhachkala on 15 July 2017 in a game against PFC CSKA Moscow.

On 16 January 2022, he signed with FC Nizhny Novgorod. On 27 July 2022, Karasyov's contract was terminated by mutual consent.

Career statistics

Notes

References

External links

1992 births
People from Orekhovo-Zuyevsky District
Living people
Russian footballers
Association football midfielders
FC SKA-Khabarovsk players
FC Anzhi Makhachkala players
FC Khimik Dzerzhinsk players
FC Lokomotiv Moscow players
FC Tambov players
FC BATE Borisov players
FC Nizhny Novgorod (2015) players
FC Rotor Volgograd players
Russian Premier League players
Russian First League players
Russian Second League players
Belarusian Premier League players
Russian expatriate footballers
Expatriate footballers in Belarus
Russian expatriate sportspeople in Belarus
Sportspeople from Moscow Oblast